Hi is the tenth studio album by Scottish alternative rock band Texas, released on 28 May 2021 through BMG. Hi was originally intended to be based on "lost" outtakes from the recording sessions of their 1997 chart-topping White on Blonde album, but this was eventually shelved and ultimately led the band to create new material.

Background and recording 
During promotion for the album, lead singer Sharleen Spiteri stated: "Our excitement at finding this treasure trove of songs collided with our excitement back then and, unplanned, new songs started coming, you could say we were inspired by ourselves!" Other songs on the album include "Dark Fire", written with Richard Hawley, and "Look What You've Done", a duet between Spiteri and Clare Grogan of Altered Images.

The record also features the ballad "Unbelievable". Speaking about the recording of the track, Spiteri said: "We don't usually do ballads, but this one really stuck. The words are very intimate and personal while the music sounds really epic."

Writing and inspiration
Several sonic elements are evident on Hi, including the "vintage R&B" track "Just Want to Be Liked", the country-inspired "Moonstar", "brawny guitar pop" on "Sound of My Voice" and "Italo-western decadence with a spicy hip-hop twist" on "Hi". "Mr. Haze" is a Motown-inspired track that samples and draws inspiration from Donna Summer's 1977 song "Love's Unkind".

Collaborations
The release and recording of Hi sees the band collaborate again with artists that have previously collaborated with the band, including singer-actress Clare Grogan on "Look What You've Done" and the Wu-Tang Clan and Ghostface Killah on "Hi".

Grogan's previously worked with McElhone when they shared time recording together during Grogan's time in the band Altered Images who were active from 1979 to 1983.

Previously, Texas had collaborated with the Wu-Tang Clan, Method Man and RZA in 1997 on the "All Day Every Day" remix of their gold-selling White on Blonde single "Say What You Want", as well as performing the track at the 1998 BRIT Awards.

Promotion and touring
To promote the release of the album, Spiteri appeared on various chat shows, including Saturday Morning with James Martin. The band announced a 27-date UK and Ireland tour across February and March 2022, commencing with two shows at Dublin's Olympia on 10 and 11 February and concluding at Stoke-On-Trent's Victoria Hall on 20 March.

Critical reception

Kate Solomon of i wrote that "Hi suggests a casual greeting, a meeting between two friends who may have drifted apart, and that is what the album feels like: falling into an easy routine with an old friend. The band built it on the foundations of old songs that hadn't made it on to White on Blonde, trading lines and themes with their selves of 24 years ago".

Camryn Teder from the website Mxdwn called Hi "a funky, sultry '70s pop-inspired epic. With influences from soft-rock '80s guitar riffs and layered chord progressions over heartbroken lyrics, the result is a peek into a love of the past and Texas's influences in the industry. [...] Texas gradually and effortlessly introduces a multitude of genres in their new album Hi. With a relentless fearlessness toward sound creation and an unwillingness to drop in quality, Texas has provided another 14 gems to their hundreds-strong song collection."

Commercial performance
In the United Kingdom, Hi became the highest charting album for the band since The Hush in 1999, debuting at number one on the UK Independent Albums Chart and number three on the official UK Albums Chart. In their native Scotland, like their previous album Jump on Board, Hi reached number one on the Scottish Albums Chart. 

Elsewhere in Europe, Hi charted at number 10 on the French Albums Chart and number 32 in Germany.

Track listing

Standard version
 "Mr Haze" – 3:39
 "Hi" (with the Wu-Tang Clan) – 2:51
 "Just Want to Be Liked" – 3:00
 "Unbelievable" – 3:31
 "Moonstar" – 2:57
 "Dark Fire" – 2:21
 "Look What You've Done" – 3:11
 "Heaven Knows" – 3:43
 "You Can Call Me" – 3:10
 "Sound of My Voice" – 3:34
 "Falling" – 3:56
 "Hi" (single mix) – 2:51

Deluxe edition bonus tracks
 "Had a Hard Day" – 3:04
 "Had to Leave" – 3:17

Charts

Weekly charts

Year-end charts

References 

2021 albums
Texas (band) albums
BMG Rights Management albums